The 2012 BNP Paribas Masters was a professional men's tennis tournament that was played on indoor hard courts. It was the 40th edition of the tournament which was part of the 2012 ATP World Tour. It took place in Paris, France between 29 October and 4 November 2012. Fourth-seeded David Ferrer won the singles title.

Singles main-draw entrants

Seeds

 Rankings are as of 22 October 2012

Other entrants
The following players received wildcards into the singles main draw:
  Michaël Llodra
  Paul-Henri Mathieu
  Benoît Paire

The following players received entry from the qualifying draw:
  Roberto Bautista Agut
  Grigor Dimitrov
  Alejandro Falla
  Guillermo García López
  Jerzy Janowicz
  Igor Sijsling

The following players received entry as lucky loser:
  Victor Hănescu
  Daniel Gimeno Traver

Withdrawals
  Roger Federer (fatigue) → replaced by  Victor Hănescu
  Mardy Fish (health issues) → replaced by  Martin Kližan
  Tommy Haas → replaced by  Albert Ramos Viñolas
  Rafael Nadal (left knee injury) → replaced by  Thomaz Bellucci 
  Andy Roddick (retired from tennis) → replaced by  Daniel Gimeno Traver

Retirements
  Kei Nishikori (right ankle injury)
  Janko Tipsarević (illness)
  Fernando Verdasco (neck injury)

Doubles main-draw entrants

Seeds

 Rankings are as of 22 October 2012

Other entrants
The following pairs received wildcards into the doubles main draw:
  Julien Benneteau /  Adrian Mannarino
  Josselin Ouanna /  Nicolas Renavand
The following pair received entry as alternates:
  Carlos Berlocq /  Denis Istomin

Withdrawals
  Fernando Verdasco (neck injury)

Retirements
  Robert Lindstedt (neck injury)

Finals

Singles

 David Ferrer defeated  Jerzy Janowicz, 6–4, 6–3
It was Ferrer's first Masters 1000 title. It was also his seventh title of the year, and eighteenth of his career.

Doubles

 Mahesh Bhupathi /  Rohan Bopanna defeated  Aisam-ul-Haq Qureshi /  Jean-Julien Rojer, 7–6(8–6), 6–3

References

External links
 Official website
 ATP tournament profile